The tenth season of Criminal Minds premiered on CBS on October 1, 2014. The series was officially renewed for a tenth season on March 13, 2014. It consists of 23 episodes. This season features Jennifer Love Hewitt playing an undercover agent who joins the BAU. Episode 19 was a pilot episode for the spin-off series Criminal Minds: Beyond Borders.

Cast 
The entire main cast returned for the season, except Jeanne Tripplehorn (Alex Blake), who left the show in the season nine finale. On July 1, 2014, it was announced that Jennifer Love Hewitt would join the show as a series regular, playing Kate Callahan, a former undercover FBI agent whose exceptional work lands her a job with the Behavioral Analysis Unit.

Main cast 
 Joe Mantegna as Supervisory Special Agent David Rossi (BAU Senior Agent)
 Shemar Moore as Supervisory Special Agent Derek Morgan (BAU Agent)
 Matthew Gray Gubler as Supervisory Special Agent Dr. Spencer Reid (BAU Agent)
 A. J. Cook as Supervisory Special Agent Jennifer "JJ" Jareau (BAU Agent)
 Kirsten Vangsness as Special Agent Penelope Garcia (BAU Technical Analyst & Co-Communications Liaison)
 Jennifer Love Hewitt as Supervisory Special Agent Kate Callahan (BAU Agent)
 Thomas Gibson as Supervisory Special Agent Aaron "Hotch" Hotchner (BAU Unit Chief & Co-Communications Liaison)

Special guest stars 
 Gary Sinise as FBI Supervisory Special Agent Jack Garrett (IRT Unit Chief)
 Anna Gunn as FBI Special Agent Lily Lambert
 Daniel Henney as Supervisory Special Agent Matthew "Matt" Simmons (BAU Agent)
 Tyler James Williams as Russ "Monty" Montgomery
 Edward Asner as Roy Brooks
 Jimmy O. Yang as Nathan Chow
 Mary Mouser as Rebecca Farland

Recurring 
 Hailey Sole as Meg Callahan
 Taylor Mosby as Markayla Davis
 Rochelle Aytes as Savannah Hayes
 Greg Grunberg as Chris Callahan
 Cade Owens as Jack Hotchner
 Amber Stevens as Joy Struthers
 Mekhai Andersen as Henry LaMontagne
 Nicholas Brendon as Kevin Lynch
 Bodhi Elfman as Peter Lewis / Mr. Scratch
 Esai Morales as Supervisory Special Agent Mateo "Matt" Cruz (BAU Section Chief)

Episodes

Ratings

Live + SD ratings

Live + 7 Day (DVR) ratings

Home media

References

External links
 

Criminal Minds
2014 American television seasons
2015 American television seasons